Nogometni klub Jezero Medvode, commonly referred to as NK Jezero Medvode or simply Jezero Medvode, is a Slovenian football club from Medvode, which competes in the MNZ Ljubljana League, the fifth tier of Slovenian football. The club was founded in 1973.

Honours
Ljubljana Regional League (fourth tier)
Winners: 2012–13

References

External links
Official website 

Association football clubs established in 1973
Football clubs in Slovenia
1973 establishments in Slovenia